The U20 SM-sarja ('Under-20 Finnish Championship Series') is the premier junior men’s ice hockey league in Finland. It was previously known as the A-nuorten SM-sarja ('Junior A Finnish Championship Series') during 1945 to 1991 and the Nuorten SM-liiga ('Junior Finnish Championship League') during 1991 to 2020. The league was founded by the Finnish Ice Hockey Association in 1945 and a Finnish Champion in men’s under-20 ice hockey has been named annually since the league’s inaugural season – with the exception of the 2019–20 season, in which the playoffs were cancelled due to the COVID-19 pandemic. Eighteen to twenty teams compete in the U20 SM-sarja regular season, which is played in a preliminary ranking stage followed by a divisional or group stage.

Teams 
Each team in the U20 SM-sarja is the junior development squad of a professional ice hockey club and shares the club’s name. Most of the senior clubs of U20 teams play in the Liiga, the premier men's ice hockey league in Finland. Notable exceptions include Jokerit, which plays in the Kontinental Hockey League (KHL), and Kiekko-Espoo, Rovaniemen Kiekko (RoKi), and TUTO Hockey, all of which play in the second-tier Mestis.

In conversation, the league and participating teams are referred to as U20, A-nuorten/A-nuoret, or U20-nuorten/U20-nuoret interchangeably – the terms originate in various naming structures used by the Finnish Ice Hockey Association over the history of the league.

2020–21 season 
Note: Oy is an abbreviation of osakeyhtiö, a type of limited company in Finland; Ab is the abbreviation of aktiebolag, the Swedish term for an osakeyhtiö. The abbreviations ry and rf refer respectively to the Finnish and Swedish terms for a registered non-profit organization in Finland.

Source:

Renamed, still in U20 SM-sarja

 JyP HT and JyP, now JYP
 Espoo Blues, now Kiekko-Espoo
 Kiekkoreipas, Hockey-Reipas, and Reipas Lahti, now Pelicans

Former clubs 
At present, this list includes only those former clubs which won a Finnish Championship medal while playing in the U20 SM-saija. 

Bold indicates U20 ice hockey team currently active and playing in the U20 Mestis.

 Hämeenlinnan Tarmo, Hämeenlinna
Helsingin Jääkiekkoklubi (HJK), Helsinki
Hermes, Kokkola
Karhu-Kissat (K-Kissat), Helsinki
KOOVEE, Tampere
previously called Tampereen Kilpa-Veljet (TK-V)
Kotkan Työväen Palloilijat (KTP), Kotka
Kuopion Palloseura (KuPS), Kuopio
Lauritsalan Kisa (LaKi), Lauritsala
Mikkelin Palloilijat, Mikkeli
Porin Pallo-Toverit (PPT), Pori
Porin Karhut, Pori
Rauman Hokki, Rauma
Reipas Lahti, Lahti
Savonlinnan Pallokerho (SaPKo), Savonlinna
Tammerfors Bollklubb (TBK), Tampere
Tampereen Kisa-Toverit (TKT), Tampere
Tampereen Pallo-Veikot (TPV), Tampere
Töölön Vesa, Helsinki
Åbo IFK, Turku (Åbo)

Champions by year 

Source:

Awards 
In 2010, the Finnish Ice Hockey Association standardized the award categories across the top leagues in each competition class under its administration: the Mestis, the Naisten Liiga, the U20 SM-sarja, the U18 SM-sarja (B-nuorten SM-sarja), and the U16 SM-sarja (C-nuorten SM-sarja). New trophies were created for award categories not previously used by a league and existing awards were renamed after iconic players in Finnish ice hockey.
 Player of the Year: Teemu Selänne Trophy
 Rookie of the Year: Yrjö Hakala Trophy
 Best Goaltender: Jorma Valtonen Trophy
 Best Defenseman: Reijo Ruotsalainen Trophy
 Best Forward: Saku Koivu Trophy
 Point Scoring Leader: Kari Jalonen Trophy
 Top Goal Scorer: Arto Javanainen Trophy
 Playoffs MVP: Ville Peltonen Trophy
 Fair-Play/Gentlemanly Player: Jere Lehtinen Trophy
 Best Plus/minus: Raimo Helminen Trophy
 Coach of the Year: Hannu Aravirta Trophy
 All-Star First & Second Teams
 Fair-Play Team

See also 
 Finland men's national junior ice hockey team
Ice hockey in Finland

References

External links
 League information and statistics from EliteProspects.com and EuroHockey.com and HockeyArchives.info 

Ice hockey leagues in Finland
Junior ice hockey leagues